CI&T is an information technology and software development company operating in Brazil, the United States, Canada, United Kingdom, Portugal, China, Colombia, Japan, and Australia. The company has expertise within the automotive, hi-tech, financial, insurance, manufacturing, media, retail, life sciences and healthcare industries.

History

CI&T was founded in 1995 as an IT group working with research and development (R&D) companies for software development before expanding to provide technical services to nearshore customers. Among the company's first clients were IBM and Hewlett-Packard (HP), Vale, Natura, and Globo.

Later, in 2002, CI&T had a large-scale project with HP developing an “electronic order fulfillment” system for the automatic replacement of stocks with large distribution companies. CI&T continued to work with Fortune 500 companies and expanded its business to include development centers located in Brazil and China, with clients mainly in the United States, Brazil, Canada, and Japan to accommodate its business around the world. In 2004, it began working with Drupal in a partnership on application management projects that later expanded to application development and content management in one of the largest Drupal implementation engagements in the world.

CI&T further expanded its business in the United States by establishing an office in Pennsylvania in 2006 and in Tokyo (Japan) and Ningbo (China) in 2009. In the following year, the company achieved a CMMI-5 maturity level after investing US$1 million in process upgrades and employee training. By 2014, the company had expanded to cities on four continents, including new locations in Brazil (Campinas, São Paulo, and Belo Horizonte), five in the U.S. (Philadelphia, Atlanta, New York City, Princeton, and Oakland), two in Europe (London and Lisbon) and two in Asia (Tokyo and Ningbo).

In 2011, CI&T provided services to Johnson and Johnson by assisting with their digital projects in the pharmaceutical industry including mobile application development, augmented reality, and social networking projects. SulAmérica, one of the largest insurance providers in Brazil, is another client; CI&T built mobile applications on Google's Cloud Platform in 2012 to provide SulAmérica with better policy quotations, digital ID cards, and comprehensive lists of accredited doctors and pharmacies.

Other clients are Yahoo!, Coca-Cola, Editora Abril, Pão de Açúcar, AB InBev and Nestlé. CI&T has been working as a technical integrator of digital marketing engagements with many of their clients. In 2006, the company partnered with Yahoo! to assist in expanding Yahoo!’s presence in South and Central American markets. Also, CI&T provided services to Coca-Cola in the beginning of 2011 for the development of mobile applications such as Coke Drink and Sprite City. Later, it provided the technology for Coca-Cola’s commissioned “Happiness Flag” for the 2014 Fifa World Cup, which was created via crowdsourced submissions of over 220,000 photos.

In 2017, CI&T acquired Conrade, a solution provider based in Oakland, in the United States. In 2019, Advent acquired 30% of CI&T participation from BNDES.

In the first quarter of 2020, CI&T expanded its operations in Europe, in London and Lisbon, and in Canada, based in Toronto to serve those markets. In the same year, the company continued its global expansion with a new push into Australia and New Zealand.

In June 2021, it announced the acquisition of Dextra, an IT services company headquartered in Campinas, near CI&T geographically. In November 2021, the company filed for an initial public offering and got listed on New York Stock Exchange (NYSE).

In 2022, CI&T announced the acquisition of three companies. The first was UK-headquartered Somo Global Ltd, an award-winning digital product agency, for US$67 million. Then came Box 1824; the transaction value was not disclosed. After that, in August 2022 the company acquired Transpire, an Australian-based technology consultancy, for US$16,4 million.

Recognition
In 2010, Forrester Research performed a case study on CI&T for its entrepreneurship engagements and agile and lean application development.

Also, CI&T was selected as one of the best service providers every year from 2008 to 2013 by the International Association of Outsourcing Professionals.

In 2012, founder and CEO of CI&T, César Gon, presented at the Lean IT Summit in Paris, France.

In 2013, CI&T was awarded Google Partner of the Year LATAM for Cloud Platform. [38] In the following year, the company was included in Gartner's “Cool Vendors in Brazil” study.

In 2015, it was named as a Strong Performer in The Forrester Wave™. Then, in 2018, it was awarded at the United Nations (UN) for practices of inclusion of people with disabilities.

Based on employees’ opinions from 2018 to 2019, CI&T was amongst the Best Places to Work 2020, according to Glassdoor.

In 2020, it was recognized by Great Place to Work Brasil as one of the best places to work in the country, for the 14th year in a row. The company is also certified in the U.S., China, and Japan.

In 2021, CI&T was recognized as a Great Place to Work for today’s youth in Canada, and also for LGBTQIA+ people in Brazil.

In 2022, Advent, CI&T’s investor, received a LCVA award for diversity and inclusion for its investment in CI&T.

List of awards and public recognitions starting from 2022

Offices

United States 
 Atlanta
 Austin
 Chicago
 New York City
 Philadelphia
 Princeton
 San Diego
 San Francisco

Brazil 
 Campinas
 São Paulo
 Belo Horizonte
 Curitiba

Australia 
 Brisbane

Canada 
 Vancouver

China 
 Ningbo 
 Shanghai
 Chengdu

Colômbia 
 Medellin

Japan 
 Tokyo

United Kingdom 
 London, England

Portugal 
 Lisbon

Acquisitions

References

Technology companies established in 1995
Brazilian companies established in 1995
Information technology companies of Brazil
Companies based in Campinas
2021 initial public offerings
Companies listed on the New York Stock Exchange